Banque Centrale Populaire is a major bank in Morocco.

The bank maintains overseas offices in Germany, England, Canada, Spain, France, Gibraltar, Netherlands and Belgium.

The bank's name is abbreviated to BCP.

As of 2012, the bank's market share of customer deposits in Morocco was 27.9 percent. This translates to customer deposits of 204.9 billion dirhams (1H2013). The number of employees in the bank at the end of 2012 was 11,878.

Related organizations
Subsidiaries - Morocco 
  
in Berrchid:
Chaabi Doc Net - online banking - 
Chaabi Mobile - online banking using mobile phones and/or text messaging

in Casablanca:
Al Istitmar Chaabi
Assalaf Chaabi
Chaabi Leasing
Chaabi LLD - auto finance
Essoukna
IFC Al Wassit
MAI Tourisme
Maroc Assistance Internationale
Média Finance
Moussahama

in Tangier:
Chaabi International Bank Off Shore - including branches in Belgium and France.

Subsidiaries - African 

Banque Populaire Maroco Guinéenne - Guinea
Banque Populaire Maroco Centrafricaine - Central African Republic

References

External links
Groupe Banque Populaire 

Banks of Morocco
Banks with year of establishment missing
Companies based in Casablanca
Moroccan brands